is the eighth feature-length Doraemon film which premiered on March 14, 1987 in Japan, based on the eighth volume of the same name of the Doraemon Long Stories series. It was the highest-grossing animated film of the year 1987.

Story

Nobita argues that dinosaur still exist, which Gian, Suneo and Shizuka disbelieve. He asks Doraemon for help but later gets convinced by Doraemon's gadget that dinosaurs are extinct when he asked whether there are dinosaurs alive "on" earth. Meanwhile, he has to find a place to hide his zero marks test papers from his Mom. While playing with Suneo's remote control airplane, Gian loses control of it and it falls into a river. After Gian has fled, Suneo saw a huge dinosaur in the river. Threatened, he meet Doraemon and Nobita, but then runs away. Nobita and Doraemon go to the hill behind their school and Doraemon finds a tunnel using his gadget Holewhere. At night Suneo again spots the same dinosaur in his yard but thinks he is sick.

Next day Nobita takes everyone to the tunnel. Suneo comes out of an exit and spots a herd of dinosaur but no one believes him. Next day they again go to underground and play while Suneo comes with camera and records his plane that drowned.

Threatened, he runs in a cave and gets lost and caught by a knight on dinosaur. Others have to hurry home as Gian's and Nobita's moms are furious, leaving Holewhere in the park.

Next day Holewhere is damaged by a truck, thus they can't go to underground again. Doraemon goes to everyone to apologize finding that Suneo is not home from three days.
Nobita and Doraemon watch Suneo's recordings and find out about the airplane.

Everyone at night goes to the river and finds the entrance to an underworld where they are caught by native Kappas. They are saved by a Knight, Banhou who tells them that Suneo is in their capital Enriru. They go to the capital and find Suneo. Banhou tells them that their memories will be erased.

While Banhou has to go for training, he asks Roo, his sister to show them the underworld but warns them to not go to a forbidden place. They go to museum to find that underworld human have evolved from dinosaurs and that something/someone is reason for extinction of dinosaurs. Also they saw a perfect rectangular land in underworld. Roo is unaware of sky, sun and stars.

While riding Dinosaur Nobita is taken to the forbidden building, where he finds a large ship and hears their plans to get surface of earth back from mammals. Nobita comes back to warn everyone and they run away. While they are chased by Flying dinosaur and are caught by Kappas. They are prepared to get cooked, but the large ship comes and saves them.

The ship turns out to be a time machine which take them to the Cretaceous era. Revealing that underworld people thought that some extraterrestrial were responsible for extinction of dinosaurs. Nobita and everyone again flee from ship and make a camp near the ship. Shizuka spots a comet approaching since they came there. Knights attack their base while the comet hits earth causing huge Tsunami and the Knights also rush to the ship which can hide underground.

While Doraemon blasts a tunnel underground to hide from Tsunami. After they realize that they made the same large rectangular place as per map. After water is removed everyone comes out of the ground.

Doraemon explains that the asteroid caused the death of all the plants and plankton. Animals dependent on plants and other animals suffered while mammals hibernated to remain alive.

To this Underworld people thought it is God's will that Dinosaurs became extinct. Doraemon then helps them to make a world underground and to take all remaining Dinosaurs there.

They are treated as heroes and sent to the surface without erasing their memories.

Cast
An English version produced and released exclusively in Malaysia by Speedy Video, features an unknown voice cast.

Release
The film was released in Japan on March 14, 1987.

References

External links 
 Doraemon The Movie 25th page 
 

1987 films
Nobita and the Knights of Dinosaurs
1987 anime films
Films about the Hollow Earth
Animated films about dinosaurs
Films directed by Tsutomu Shibayama
Films scored by Shunsuke Kikuchi